Greg Ouellette (born 19 May 1986) is an American Professional tennis player. Ouellette reached a career high singles ranking of 269 on August 12, 2011 winning 5 professional singles titles and 7 doubles titles.  He was named the International Tennis Federation (ITF) Player of the Month in October 2010.

Ouellette won a Bronze Medal at the 2011 Pan American Games held in Guadalajara, Mexico.

During his collegiate career at the University of Florida, Ouellette advanced to the quarterfinals of the 2005 NCAA singles tournament in his freshman season.  His record was 11-0  at the #2 position in SEC matches and was named the 2005 SEC Freshman of the Year and the Southeast Region Rookie of the Year.

In the 2008 NCAA singles tournament, Ouellette appeared as the number 2 seed.  He was honored as the 2008 SEC Player of the Year and completed his collegiate career as a five time All-American which marks as the most honors in Gator Men's Tennis history.

He is currently coaching for the Boise State Bronco Men's Tennis team.

ATP Challenger and ITF Futures finals

Singles: 5 (5-3)

Doubles: 7 (7-9)

See also 

Florida Gators
List of Florida Gators tennis players

Awards
International Tennis Federation (ITF) 2010 ITF Player of the Month
Southeastern Conference (SEC) Freshman of the Year
Southeastern Conference 2005, 2006, 2007, 2008 men's tennis  All-SEC first team
Southeastern Conference 2008 SEC Player of the Year
Intercollegiate Tennis Association (ITA) 2008 Jon Van Nostrand Award

References

Living people
American male tennis players
University of Florida alumni
1986 births
Pan American Games medalists in tennis
Pan American Games bronze medalists for the United States
Tennis players at the 2011 Pan American Games
Medalists at the 2011 Pan American Games
Tennis people from Florida
Florida Gators men's tennis players